Vernon Padgett (January 26, 1894 – April 21, 1964) was an American equestrian. He competed in four events at the 1924 Summer Olympics.

References

External links
 

1894 births
1964 deaths
American male equestrians
Olympic equestrians of the United States
Equestrians at the 1924 Summer Olympics
People from Walterboro, South Carolina